A Tanítónő is a 1945 Hungarian drama film directed by Márton Keleti. It was entered into the 1947 Cannes Film Festival.

Cast
 Éva Szörényi - Tóth Flóra, a tanítónõ
 Pál Jávor - ifj. Nagy István
 Kálmán Rózsahegyi - Fõúr
 Zoltán Várkonyi - Tuza Zsolt tanító
 Lili Berky - id. Nagy Istvánné
 Gyula Gózon - Kántor
 Jenő Bodnár - id. Nagy István
 György Dénes - Fõszolgabíró
 Lajos Rajczy - Káplán
 Zsuzsa Bánki - Katica (as Bánky Zsuzsa)
 Manyi Kiss - Táncosnõ
 Kató Bárczy
 Zoltán Makláry - John, a lovász
 László Keleti - Patikus
 Ödön Bárdi

References

External links

1945 films
1940s Hungarian-language films
1945 drama films
Hungarian black-and-white films
Films directed by Márton Keleti
Hungarian drama films